Every Night may refer to:

 Every Night (Saturday Looks Good to Me album), 2004
 Every Night (Yōsui Inoue album), 1980
 "Every Night" (EXID song), 2012
 "Every Night" (Pake McEntire song), 1986
 "Every Night" (Paul McCartney song), 1970
 "Ev'ry Night", a song by Mandaryna, 2005
 "Every Night", a song by Hannah Diamond, 2014
 "Every Night", a song by Imagine Dragons from Night Visions, 2012

See also
 Everynight ... Everynight, a 1994 Australian film